DYSS-TV (channel 7) is a television station in Metro Cebu, Philippines, serving as the Visayas flagship of the GMA network. It is owned and operated by the network's namesake corporate parent alongside GTV outlet DYLS-TV (channel 27). Both stations share studios at the GMA Skyview Complex, Nivel Hills, Apas, Cebu City, while DYSS-TV's hybrid analog and digital transmitting facility is located atop Mount Busay, Brgy. Bonbon.

Timeline
November 20, 1963 - The origin of GMA Cebu can traced back to radio station in Cebu, DYSS (1560 kHz (now 999 kHz) AM band), which began airing its radio operations on July 4, 1957, and launched its first provincial AM station in Cebu City. DYSS was then owned by GMA Network's predecessor Loreto F. de Hemedes Inc. through DZBB in Manila, later Republic Broadcasting System, Inc. of Robert "Uncle Bob" Stewart. Upon the launch, their old studios of radio operation in Fortunata Building, at the corner of Magallanes & Lapu-lapu Streets, Cebu City, with the location of 1-kilowatt BC Gates Transmitter is at Mambaling Seaside. After the success of its radio station, the company ventured into television and started operations as DYSS Channel 7 Cebu. With this venture, DYSS-TV Channel 7 became the third VHF television station established in Cebu City after the establishment of provincial stations of ABS Channel 3 (owned by ABS-CBN's predecessor Alto Broadcasting System) and ABC Channel 11 (owned by the Associated Broadcasting Corporation) which began its broadcasts on June 14, 1961, and September 11, 1963, respectively. The original studios of TV operations was inaugurated since then at the Sundowner Centrepoint Hotel along Plaridel St. cor. Osmeña Blvd., Cebu City and at that time, the station broadcast with a power output of 5,000 watts.
March 1, 1969 - RBS was then known as "Greater 7 Cebu", using the Circle 7 logo that ABC was using for all of its owned-and-operated stations at the time. The station's programming is composed of canned programs from the United States and it later produced local programs.
September 21, 1972 - Following the proclamation of Martial Law by then President Ferdinand Marcos, DYSS-TV was forced to shut down, though it only lasted for more than 3 months. In December of the same year, DYSS-TV (along with the flagship station in Manila, DZBB-TV) was given the green light by the National Media Production Center (NMPC) to return on the air, however with limited three-month permits.
1974 - RBS were sold to a triumvirate composed of Felipe Gozon, Gilberto Duavit Sr., and Menardo Jimenez. Under the new management, DYSS-TV reopened with a new identity as GMA Radio-Television Arts and introduced the Where You Belong slogan to catch the attention of local viewers. Despite its network rebranding, Republic Broadcasting System, Inc. remained as its corporate name until 1996. The relaunch of GMA, aside from sporting a light blue square logo with the network name in white, also had a circle 7 logo in use. In its final years, the blue circle 7 logo used was similar to those used by the ABC in some United States cities (later used the rainbow colors of red, yellow, green and blue stripes, as GMA prepares for a network reformatting). In the same year, DYSS-TV was converted into an originating station with its English local news bulletin "GMA News Digest Cebu", a local newscast which served as affiliate to GMA News Roundup (later GMA News Digest).
1979 - GMA News Digest Cebu was relaunched and became News at Seven Cebu, following the launch of GMA's flagship newscast News at Seven which premiered on November 1, 1976, to face the increasing competition of its English local newscast GTV-3's News Today (now Newscenter 3 Cebu in 1980 and then went defunct), which debuted in 1978.
January 20, 1980 - DYSS-TV launched its first live coverage of Sinulog Festival with its first location in Plaza Independencia, Cebu City. This was the same year that it premiered Goot da Wanderpol, the channel's first local drama production in the Cebuano language.
1981 - To serve local viewers further, DYSS-TV launched its first ever Cebuano language newscast, Mga Balita sa Kilum-Kilum, as well as a local business show to promote Cebuano entrepreneurs.
1990 - DYSS-TV transferred its studios and transmitter to new facilities located at GMA Skyview Complex in Nivel Hills, Apas, Cebu City for better broadcast equipments and an upgraded transmitter tower, with increased transmitting power output to 60,000 watts (259,000 watts ERP) to replace an old 5-kilowatt TPO located at the Sundowner Centrepoint Hotel in Plaridel St. for 3 decades. The transmitter upgrades resulted in clearer and better signal reception in Metro Cebu, and the Central and Eastern Visayas.
April 30, 1992 - as part of the network's expansion of coverage which started exactly four years after with the inauguration of the station's Tower of Power in its flagship station in Quezon City, Metro Manila, DYSS-TV was launched as the Rainbow Satellite Network. Through its nationwide satellite broadcast, GMA's national programmings were seen across the Philippine archipelago and Southeast Asia resulting in DYSS becoming a relay (satellite-selling) station of the network's flagship station DZBB-TV Channel 7 Manila to reach Cebuano viewers around the Central Visayas Region, Leyte and Samar, while retaining local programming to match up with its rivals. With the launch, GMA utilizes a new logo to correspond with the rebranding and a satellite-beaming rainbow in a multicolored striped based on the traditional scheme of red, orange, yellow, green, blue, indigo and violet, with GMA in a metallic form uses a San Serif Futura Extra Bold and analogous gloominess of Indigo as its fonts in the letters. GMA was the official broadcaster of the 1995 World Youth Day, which was the last visit of Pope John Paul II to the country.
May 16, 1996 - Republic Broadcasting System formally changed its corporate name to GMA Network Incorporated, with GMA now standing for Global Media Arts.
October 1999 - GMA Channel 7 Cebu launched its local newscast Balitang Bisdak with Bobby Nalzaro as its sole anchor, two years after he was resigned with Bombo Radyo Cebu and joined with GMA/RGMA Cebu.
2005 - "Balitang Bisdak" and "Singgit Cebu" were re-launched and were taken under the wing of GMA News & Public Affairs and GMA Entertainment TV Group respectively. In October of the same year, GMA Entertainment TV Group in Cebu re-launched "Oi!", a local variety show which saying it was dynamic, interactive and stylish, leveling to the standards of GMA-7's Sunday variety show SOP.
October 8, 2007 - GMA News & Public Affairs Cebu's local morning show, "Buena Mano Balita" was launched, patterned from GMA Manila's morning news program Unang Hirit. On November 12 of the same year, GMA Cebu and Television And Production Exponents Inc. (TAPE) launched its first ever regional version "Eat Na Ta!", which was a daily game show on radio through DYSS Super Radyo Cebu 999 kHz (aired during weekdays), and later evolved into a live TV program aired on this channel (aired during Saturdays). It served as a pre-programming for Eat Bulaga! in Visayas until 2008.
2010s - GMA Cebu upgraded to its transmitter tower and equipment, and the opening of a 60,000-watt transmitter power output (TPO) located in Mt. Busay, Brgy. Bonbon, Cebu City, resulting in improved signal quality throughout Central and Eastern Visayas.
November 10, 2014 - as part of their changes of graphics and theme music of the network's flagship newscast of 24 Oras, GMA News & Public Affairs Cebu was re-launched and adopted the branding of its flagship regional newscast "24 Oras Central Visayas".
February 1, 2016 - GMA News & Public Affairs Cebu's flagship regional newscast 24 Oras Central Visayas reverted to the original title Balitang Bisdak, just after more than a year hiatus together with GMA Dagupan's Balitang Amianan. Follow the return, DYSS became the oldest local newscast of GMA Network in the Central and Eastern Visayas since its premiere in 1999.
November 13, 2017 - Balitang Bisdak was relaunched similar to sister newscasts Balitang Amianan (now One North Central Luzon) and One Mindanao, which will be simultaneously broadcast in key cities and provinces in Central and Eastern Visayas through GMA Network's local channels in Tacloban, Bohol and Ormoc.
May 23, 2018 - GMA Cebu commenced its ISDB-T digital test broadcasts on UHF Channel 26 covering Metro Cebu and the provinces of Cebu, Negros Oriental and Bohol, as well as several parts of Leyte and Samar.
April 20, 2020 - GMA Cebu launched GMA Regional TV Live!, its first ever morning program following the 2015 cancellation of Buena Mano Balita.
December 16, 2021 - GMA Cebu went off the air due to aftermath of Typhoon Rai (Odette) at the evening, which damaged electrical lines and the trees near GMA Complex and its transmitters brought about by the typhoon. A day later, it went back on the air but with limited broadcast hours from 4:00 to 8:00 PM for emergency broadcast.
January 12, 2022 - The program resumed operations after power was restored in the area and thus resuming the production of GMA's local programs and religious shows, most program line-up are derived from Manila's flagship station.

GMA Cebu local programmings
As of April 20, 2019, DYSS-TV currently produces around 1 hour of local programming. However, the station does not produce nor distribute local contents to its coverage area on weekend (although the station aired local advertising), with exceptions of The Word of God Network; which airing every Sundays, and major events held in the city covered by GMA Regional TV. During Paschal Triduum of the Holy Week annually, DYSS-TV was closed down as an originating station, when it report to a direct satellite station of DZBB-TV in Metro Manila broadcasting the national programming schedule.

Current
 Balitang Bisdak
 Word of God Network
 GMA Regional TV Live!
 Sunday Catholic TV Mass Cebu (produced in cooperation with Daughters of St. Paul - Cebu)
 Sinulog Festival (annually, every 3rd Sunday of January)

Formerly-produced or distributed programs
 24 Oras Central Visayas
 Ang Bastonero (1999-2000) (also aired on GMA Davao)
 Buena Mano Balita
 Coffee with Us (1978–1981)
 Eat Na Ta!
 GMA Musicale
 GMA News Cebu
 Istayl Nato
Central Visayas Isyu Karon
 Ka Ina (first broadcast on Citynet 27 Manila (now GTV))
 Kape at Balita
 Let's Fiesta
 Mga Balita sa Kilum-Kilum (1981–1986)
 News at Seven Cebu (1978–1999)
 News Digest Cebu (1974–1978)
 Oi!
 Sabado Box Office Hits
 Holy Mass
 Siete Palabras @ Cebu Metropolitan Cathedral (every Good Friday)
 Siete Palabras (annually, every Good Friday, produced in cooperation with Archdiocese of Cebu)
 Goot da Wanderpol (also aired on SBN-GMA TV-7 Davao) (1980-1985)
 Singgit Cebu (1999–2005)
 The Visayan Agenda (special programming for 2010 elections)
 Visita Iglesia

Digital television

Digital channels

DYSS-TV's digital signal operates on UHF channel 26 (545.143 MHz) and broadcasts on the following subchannels:

Current Personalities
Alan Domingo, Anchor and Regional Correspondent of Balitang Bisdak
Lou Anne Mae Rondina, Co-Anchor and Regional Correpsondent of Balitang Bisdak, also as National Anchor of Regional TV News alongside with Cecille Quibod-Castro.
Cecille Quibod-Castro, Co-Anchor of Balitang Bisdak and Co-Host of GMA Regional TV Live!
Nikko Sereno, Host and Regional Correspondent of GMA Regional TV Live!.
Fe Marie Dumaboc

Former personalities
Pablito "Bobby" Nalzaro†
Atty. Rose Versoza
Monching Auxtero
Ana Desamparado
Ara Labra
Jun Veliganio
Mark Anthony Bautista
Bexmae Jumao-as
Greggy Magdadaro
Ching Pelayo
Lalaine Go
Aynee Triumfante
Vic Serna
Ademar Ochotorena
Chona Carreon – Senior Correspondent
Lian Sinculan (now with DYRB Radyo Pilipino 540 Cebu)
Yuri Deldig a.k.a. Yuri Richards† – House Attack segment reporter
Victor Camion – Dumaguete correspondent (now with 89.5 Brigada News FM Dumaguete)
Leo Udtohan – Bohol correspondent (now with 90.3 Radyo Bandera News FM Bohol)
Ronnie Roa – Leyte correspondent (now with 93.5 Brigada News FM Tacloban)

Areas of coverage
 Cebu City
 Cebu
 Portion of Bohol
 Portion of Negros Oriental
 Portion of Leyte

Rebroadcasters

DYSS-TV's programming is relayed to the following stations across the Central Visayas, and most of the Eastern Visayas.

See also
DZBB-TV
DYRT
DYSS
GMA Network
List of GMA Network stations

References

GMA Network stations
Digital television stations in the Philippines
Television stations in Cebu City
Television channels and stations established in 1963